Arabs in Switzerland  are Swiss citizens or residents of Arab ethnic, cultural and linguistic heritage from Arab countries, particularly Morocco, Tunisia, Algeria, Lebanon, Syria, Iraq and Egypt, also small groups from Palestine, Yemen, Libya, Jordan and Sudan, who emigrated from their native nations and currently reside in Switzerland.

History

In the 10th century, Arabs from their Mediterranean Fraxinet base settled in the Valais for a few decades. They occupied the Great St. Bernard Pass and even managed to reach as far as St. Gallen to the north and Raetia in the east.

The influx of Arab immigrants from various Arab countries since the early years of the twentieth century, most Arabs came to study, work or residence in Switzerland.

Demographics 

Swiss people of Arab origin (predominantly from Maghreb but also some from Mashreq areas of the Arab world) in Switzerland. There are no official figures concerning the demographics of Swiss people of Arab descent.

Maghreb 

The number of nearly 18,000 people by the end of the first decade became nationals of Arab Maghreb countries, make up 1% of the total foreign population in Switzerland. However, the presence and impact of this demographic in the public arena Swiss far greater than the actual number, according to a scientific study done by a comprehensive forum for Immigration Studies at the University of Neuchatel, commissioned by the State Secretariat for Migration, Switzerland.

By the end of 2010, Switzerland was hosting on its territory, especially in the big cities and in the French-speaking cantons, nearly all 18,000 permanent resident of the three Arab Maghreb countries distributed as follows: Morocco (7469), Tunisia (6418), Algeria (5822). The following chart shows the evolution of the number of permanent residents of the Maghrebis in Switzerland, according to their countries of origin in the period between 1981 and 2010.

Maghrebis are stationed in the Romandy. 64% of Algerians, 67% of Moroccans and 56% of Tunisians living in the French-speaking cantons, more than half of Moroccans and Algerians divided between the Canton of Geneva and Canton of Vaud, but this phenomenon is less severe for Tunisians where we find about 30% of them in the German-speaking cantons, especially in major cities.

The core index, which is used in Switzerland to distinguish between immigrant groups is the type of residence permit: There is a permanent residence (statement of class B and C), and temporary or seasonal residence (of class G, F, N and S). the report indicates that migrants Moroccans, Tunisians and Algerians have witnessed remarkable transformation since 1994, from temporary accommodation to permanent residency, after allowing for specific legal immigrants to apply for Swiss citizenship. For example, in 2009, 90% of Moroccans and Tunisians immigrants holders of residence permits of class B and C, while it was 70% for the Algerians in 2000.
The largest group of residents of North African origin are from Morocco.

Mashriq 

In March 2012, the United Nations Office of the High Commissioner for Human Rights made a request to Switzerland to accept some Syrian refugees, and the Swiss government announced that it was considering the request. In March 2015, the Swiss Federal Council set a goal of accepting 3,000 Syrian refugees over three years. By September 2015, 5,000 Syrian refugees had received provisional permission to live in Switzerland, and an additional 2,000 had submitted asylum applications and were pending.

According to the Joshua Project there are 16,000 from Lebanon living in Switzerland. 

According to the Iraqi community in Switzerland there are 5,159 from Iraq. Obtaining permits from the category (C) (to establish an unlimited term): 2.533
Obtaining permits from the category (B) (to establish long-term): 2.625
The number of Iraqis residing in a non-permanent (until the end of October 2013): Obtaining permits from the class (L) (to establish short-term): 4
Number of Iraqi refugees 2.143 (situation at the end of the month of November 2013): Holders of temporary residence of the category (N) (especially asylum seekers): 379. Obtaining permits from the class (F) (temporary residence on humanitarian grounds): 1.764 

According to official statistics there are 7,185 Iraqis in 2013.

Culture

Religion 

The majority of Arabs are Muslims, according to the Association Culturelle des Femmes Musulmanes de Suisse A.C.F.M.S Arab community which has about 30,000 people represents only 18% of the entire Muslim community. There are also Arab Christians from Arab countries, particularly Lebanon and Syria, and other faiths, such as the Druze.

Language 

Arabs in Switzerland speaks Arabic as a mother tongue. The four national languages of Switzerland are German, French, Italian and Romansh. Thus the Arabs speak the language which is official in the cantons of Switzerland.

Notable people

Cédric El-Idrissi, athlete of Moroccan origin.
Djamel Mesbah, footballer of Algerian origin.
Hassan Naim, biochemist of Lebanese origin.
Hussein Naim, biochemist and molecular virologist of Lebanese origin.
Hani Ramadan, Imam of Egyptian origin.
 Ismael Tajouri-Shradi, footballer of Libyan origin
Kariem Hussein, athlete of Egyptian origin.
Kerim Frei, footballer of Moroccan origin.
Karim Rossi, footballer of Moroccan origin.
Kaled Gourmi, footballer of Algerian origin.
Kamel Larbi, footballer of Algerian origin.
Lydia Canaan, singer-songwriter, poet, humanitarian, activist, and musical pioneer of Lebanese origin.
Meriame Terchoun, footballer of Algerian origin.
Mohamed Al-Fayed, business magnate of Egyptian origin.
Mourad Dhina, physicist and activistof Algerian origin.
Nessim Gaon, financier of Sudanese origin.
Nicolas Hayek, entrepreneur, co-founder, CEO and Chairman of the Board of the Swatch Group of Lebanese origin.
Nabilla Benattia, model and a personality on French reality TV of Algerian origin.
Philippe Jabre, the founder and CIO of Jabre Capital Partners S.A of Lebanese origin.
Samir Brikho, businessman (was Chief Executive of Amec Foster Wheeler of Lebanese origin
Sarah Atcho, sprinter of Moroccan origin.
Sarah Lahbati, actress and reality show of Moroccan origin.
Tariq Ramadan, academic, philosopher and writer of Egyptian origin.
 Nassim Ben Khalifa, Footballer of Tunisian origin
 Yassin Mikari, footballer of tunisian origin

See also

Immigration to Switzerland
Arab diaspora
Arabs in Europe

External links

 GESELLSCHAFT SCHWEIZ
 Cordoba Foundation of Geneva (CFG)
 Think Lebanon
 AGENDA CULTUREL
 Kinderhilfe Bethlehem
 Switzerland-Morocco Foundation for Sustainable Development (SMFD)
 The Tunisian community association in Switzerland
 The Iraqi community in Switzerland
 Lisan Verlag
 Gemma Sakz

References

Ethnic groups in Switzerland
Islam in Switzerland
Swiss people of Arab descent
Arab diaspora in Europe
Muslim communities in Europe